Montainville may refer to:

 Montainville, Eure-et-Loir, a commune in the Eure-et-Loir department in France
 Montainville, Yvelines, a commune in the Yvelines department in France